Kenneth Sean Carson is a fashion doll and fictional character invented by Elliot Handler and introduced by American toy company Mattel in 1961 as the counterpart of Barbie, who was introduced two years earlier. Ken was named after Kenneth Handler, son of Barbie creator/inventor Ruth Handler, just as Barbie was named after her daughter. Ken Handler died in 1994 of a brain tumor.

Similar to Barbie, Ken is from Willows, Wisconsin and has a fashionable line of clothing and accessories (although he made his debut wearing only a swimsuit). In the Barbie mythos, Ken met Barbie on the set of a TV commercial and is her boyfriend, per promotional box inscriptions from his debut until 2018. Currently, he is perceived as one of Barbie's main friends. Since his debut, Ken has held over 40 occupations; the latest being a marine biologist, as depicted in the 2017 Netflix film Barbie: Dolphin Magic.

Overview

Superstar Ken 
From 1961 to the debut of Superstar Ken in 1977, Ken had straight arms that didn't bend. His head could only turn left and right. Ken's hair was made of felt in his first year (known to collectors as the "flocked" hair Ken), but this was replaced with a plastic, molded hairstyle when the creators realized that the felt hair fell off when wet.  Superstar Ken featured a dimpled smile, a head that could swivel, bent arms, a more muscular physique, jewelry, and underwear permanently molded to his body. The woman who made the Ken doll made it to resemble her husband.

Ken's Friends 

Ken's best friend, Allan Sherwood (Midge's boyfriend, later husband), was introduced in 1964.  The first African American male doll, Brad, was introduced in 1968, as the boyfriend of Barbie's African American friend, Christie, who was introduced in 1967.

Earring Magic Ken 

In 1993, Earring Magic Ken was released. The style of the doll was thought to resemble fashions and accessories worn by some segments of the gay community at the time, and "Earring Magic Ken" subsequently attained a cult following, becoming a collector's item.

Breakup and rekindling with Barbie 
In February 2004, Mattel announced a split for Ken and Barbie, with Russell Arons, vice president of marketing at Mattel, saying that Barbie and Ken "feel it's time to spend some quality time – apart...Like other celebrity couples, their Hollywood romance has come to an end", though Arons indicated that the duo would "remain friends".

In February 2006 however, a revamped version of the Ken doll was launched, though it was stated that his relationship with Barbie was still purely platonic. In 2011, Mattel launched a massive campaign for Ken to win Barbie's affections back. The pair officially reunited on Valentine's Day 2011.

Sugar Daddy Ken 
In October 2009, Mattel announced a new Palm Beach line which included a "Sugar's Daddy Ken" doll aimed for adult collectors. The said line officially debuted in the spring of 2010. The line proved to be controversial, because of Ken's suggestive-sounding name. The doll had a more mature appearance and came with a West Highland Terrier puppy. Mattel defended the doll's name, saying that the puppy's name is "Sugar", thus making Ken "Sugar's Daddy".

In 2011, Mattel introduced Japan Ken, the first Ken doll to be included in the "Dolls of the World" collection, which was formerly a Barbie-only line. The Japan Ken doll features a new face sculpt.

New Looks 
In 2021, Mattel announced 15 new looks for Ken. This included looks with different skin tones, body shapes and hair styles. Barbie underwent a similar makeover in 2020. Outside of this change, Ken hasn't changed much since he was introduced 56+ years ago.

Careers 

 Astronaut (clothing pack 1965)
 Banker (playset 1995)
 Barista (2019)
 Baseball player (clothing pack 1991)
 Basketball player (clothing pack 2021)
 Boxer (clothing pack 1963)
 Businessman (clothing pack 1992)
 Cameraman (playset 1987)
 Coach (clothing pack 1992)
 Country Western singer (1999)
 Cowboy (Venezuela-exclusive Llanero 1989)
 Dancer (2011)
 Dentist (2020)
 Doctor (1987, 1988, clothing pack 1992, 1998, 2010, 2012)
 Dog trainer (2020)
 Drum major (clothing pack 1964)
 Farmer (2019)
 Fashion model (2003)
 Film art director (2003)
 Firefighter (2010, 2019)
 Football player (clothing pack 1992)
 Golfer (clothing pack 2019)
 Hamburger chef (clothing pack 2020)
 Movie star (1977, 1988)
 Ice skater (1990)
 Lifeguard (1995, 2019)
 Nurse (clothing pack 2021)
 Olympic athlete (Venezuela-exclusive 1988)
 Olympic figure skater (1997)
 Olympic hockey player (clothing pack 1975)
 Olympic skier (1975)
 Olympic swimmer (1975)
 Photographer (2000)
 Pilot (clothing pack 1964, clothing pack 1973, 1990, 2014)
 Pizza chef (clothing pack 2019)
 Rapper (1992)
 Referee (clothing pack 2019)
 Reporter (clothing pack 1965, 2015)
 Rock star (1987, 1989, clothing pack 1991)
 Sailor (clothing pack 1963)
 Saxophonist (clothing pack 2020)
 Science teacher (clothing pack 2020)
 Skier (clothing pack 1963)
 Snowboarder (2012)
 Soccer player (2019)
 Soda fountain worker (clothing pack 1964, 2000)
 Spy (2015)
 Starfleet engineering officer (1996)
 Tennis player (1979)
 United States Air Force pilot (clothing pack 1963, 1993)
 United States Air Force Thunderbirds pilot (1994)
 United States Army officer (clothing pack 1963, 1992)
 United States Marine Corps sergeant (1992)
 Wildlife veterinarian (2020)

Criticism 
Ken's body proportions have been described as unrealistic by scholarly studies (his chest is estimated to be about 27.5% too large for a representative human male). Unrealistic body proportions in Barbie dolls, including Ken's, have been connected to some eating disorders in children. Another controversy has also centered around the visibility (or lack of it) of Ken's male genitalia.

Media/Multimedia Appearances
Ken has starred in various roles not disclosed by Mattel in the Barbie media franchise including the Barbie films, Barbie: Life in the Dreamhouse, Barbie Dreamhouse Adventures and Barbie: It Takes Two.

Billy Flanigan appeared as Ken in "Disney’s Magical World of Barbie". René Dif appeared as Ken.In the music video  Barbie Girl

Ken appeared in the Toy Story films from Pixar from Toy Story 2 onward. His vocals in the third film which he appeared in as one of the henchmen of the film's villain, Lots-O'-Huggin' Bear, was provided by Michael Keaton.

Lil B's 2017 mixtape Black Ken was named after Ken.

In 2019, Pete Davidson and Julia Fox were a part of a photo shoot in Paper Magazine where Davidson posed as Ken and Fox posed as Barbie. The photo shoot was created for the 'Break the Internet' series of the Magazine which was made popular by Kim Kardashian's popular, "Champagne Incident" portrait.

Names
Ken's personal name is Kenneth Sean Carson. His given name comes from the son of Elliot and Ruth Handler. In the 1960s Random House books, his surname is Carson. According to Mattel, his middle name is Sean.

Bibliography
"Barbie and Ken: History." Olsen, Eric. Blog Critics Magazine, 15 February 2004. 15 February 2004.
"How do Barbie and Ken Measure Up?" Linda Berg-Cross, Psychotherapy Letter, April 1996, Volume 8, Issue 4, Page 3.
History from Mattel Inc. 2001

References

External links 
 Keeping Ken

1960s toys
Barbie
Doll brands
Male characters in advertising
Mascots introduced in 1961
Products introduced in 1961
Toy mascots